The Politics of Zhangjiajie in Hunan province in the People's Republic of China is structured in a dual party-government system like all other governing institutions in mainland China.

The Mayor of Zhangjiajie is the highest-ranking official in the People's Government of Zhangjiajie or Zhangjiajie Municipal Government. However, in the city's dual party-government governing system, the Mayor has less power than the Communist Party of Zhangjiajie Municipal Committee Secretary, colloquially termed the "CPC Party Chief of Zhangjiajie" or "Communist Party Secretary of Zhangjiajie".

List of mayors of Zhangjiajie

List of CPC Party secretaries of Zhangjiajie

References

Zhangjiajie
Zhangjiajie